John Mortimer Fourette Smith (June 23, 1935 – January 22, 2019) was an American prelate of the Roman Catholic Church. He served as the ninth bishop of the Diocese of Trenton in New Jersey from 1997 to 2010. He previously served as bishop of the Diocese of Pensacola-Tallahassee in Florida from 1991 to 1995 and as an auxiliary bishop of the Archdiocese of Newark in New Jersey from 1987 to 1991

Biography

Early life 
John Smith was born on June 23, 1935, in Orange, New Jersey, to Mortimer and Ethel (née Charnock) Smith. The oldest of three children, he had two brothers, Andrew (who later became a Benedictine monk) and Gregory. 

John Smith attended Saint Benedict's Preparatory School in Newark and John Carroll University in Cleveland, Ohio. In 1955, he entered Immaculate Conception Seminary, a branch of Seton Hall University, obtaining a Bachelor's degree in classical languages in 1957.

Priesthood 
Smith was ordained to the priesthood for the Archdiocese of Newark by Archbishop Thomas Boland on May 27, 1961. He then served as assistant chancellor, as defender of the bond of the Metropolitan Tribunal, and director of the Cursillo movement for the archdiocese.

Smith earned a Bachelor of Sacred Theology degree (1961) and a doctorate in canon law (1966) from the Catholic University of America in Washington, D.C. He was also a visiting professor of pastoral theology at the Immaculate Conception Seminary, an elected representative on the archdiocesan Council of Priests, and dean of central Bergen County. Smith was raised to the rank of papal chamberlain by Pope Paul VI in 1971, and assigned to the team ministry of St. Joseph Church in Oradell in 1973.

In 1982, Smith became a faculty memberof the Pontifical North American College in Rome, where he was director of the Institute for Continuing Theological Education and program director of the U.S. Bishops' Consultation IV. Upon his return to New Jersey in 1986, he was named pastor of St. Mary's Parish in Dumont and later vicar general and moderator of the curia.

Auxiliary Bishop of Newark 
On November 20, 1987, Smith was appointed Titular Bishop of Tres Tabernae and as an auxiliary bishop of the Archdiocese of Newark by Pope John Paul II. He received his episcopal consecration on January 25, 1988, from Archbishop Theodore McCarrick, with Archbishop Peter Gerety and Bishop Walter Curtis serving as co-consecrators. From November 1985 to July 1991, including his time as auxiliary bishop of Newark, Smith lived with McCarrick at the Newark cathedral rectory.

Bishop of Pensacola-Tallahassee
Smith was named the third bishop of the Diocese of Pensacola-Tallahassee on June 25, 1991, by John Paul II. He was installed on July 31 of that year.

Coadjutor Bishop and Bishop of Trenton
On November 21, 1995, Smith was appointed coadjutor bishop of the Diocese of Trenton. He succeeded Bishop John C. Reiss as the ninth bishop of Trenton upon the latter's resignation on June 30, 1997.

In 2002, Smith removed a priest accused of molesting a young boy from an administrative position in the diocese. The diocese had reported the allegation to the Monmouth County prosecutor's office when it was first made in 1990, but prosecutors had decided not to file criminal charges because of insufficient evidence. Smith relieved the priest of his duties following a review of personnel files to ensure the public's confidence in the clergy.

Retirement and legacy 
On June 4, 2010, David M. O'Connell was named coadjutor bishop of the diocese, and on December 1, 2010, Pope Benedict VI accepted Smith's resignation as bishop of Trenton.

John Smith died in Morris Hall Meadows Home in Lawrenceville, New Jersey, on January 22, 2019, following a long illness.

In November 2020, a Vatican investigation into defrocked cardinal Theodore McCarrick identified Smith as one of three bishops who "provided inaccurate and incomplete information to the Holy See regarding McCarrick’s sexual conduct with young adults" when McCarrick was a candidate for the post of Archbishop of Washington in 2000.

See also

 Catholic Church hierarchy
 Catholic Church in the United States
 Historical list of the Catholic bishops of the United States
 List of Catholic bishops of the United States
 Lists of patriarchs, archbishops, and bishops

References

External links

Roman Catholic Diocese of Trenton Official Site

 

 

1935 births
2019 deaths
John Carroll University alumni
Seton Hall University alumni
People from Orange, New Jersey
Roman Catholic bishops of Newark
Roman Catholic bishops of Trenton
Roman Catholic bishops of Pensacola–Tallahassee
St. Benedict's Preparatory School alumni
20th-century Roman Catholic bishops in the United States
21st-century Roman Catholic bishops in the United States
Catholics from New Jersey